The 1933 Gonzaga Bulldogs football team was an American football team that represented Gonzaga University as an independent during the 1933 college football season. In their third year under head coach Mike Pecarovich, the Bulldogs compiled a 2–6–1 record and were outscored by a total of 96 to 40.

Schedule

References

Gonzaga
Gonzaga Bulldogs football seasons
Gonzaga Bulldogs football